Passion Flower Hotel (also known as Leidenschaftliche Blümchen, also known as Boarding School) is a 1978 coming of age comedy film directed by André Farwagi. It is a liberal adaptation of the 1962 novel Passion Flower Hotel and stars Nastassja Kinski as one of the schoolgirls, in her third feature film.

Plot
Summer of 1956. Curious American girl Deborah Collins (Kinski) arrives at the St. Clara's Boarding School in Switzerland. The school headmistress wants to use Deborah as a tool to discipline the other girls but she is revealed to be more experienced and daring in sexual matters. The girls now plot to lose their virginity with the boys in the private school across the lake. After Deborah finally has sex with Frederick Sinclair (Sundquist) in a romantic setting, she is expelled and the other girls feel that everything will be so sad and boring without her. She informs the headmistress that she will tell everyone that the school is run by disreputable teachers if she expels the other girls. She departs on a train after kissing Frederick goodbye.

Cast
Nastassja Kinski - Deborah Collins
Gerry Sundquist - Frederick Irving Benjamin Sinclair
Stefano D'Amato - Plumpudding
Gabriele Blum - Cordelia
Sean Chapman - Rodney
Veronique Delbourg - Marie Louise
Nigel Graves - Carlos
Marion Kracht - Jane
Carolin Ohrner - Gabi
Fabiana Udenio - Gina
Kurt Raab - Fletcher

References

External links 
 
 
 

1978 films
1978 comedy films
1970s coming-of-age comedy films
German coming-of-age comedy films
German teen films
1970s German-language films
West German films
Films about virginity
Films set in Switzerland
Films set in 1956
Films based on British novels
Films set in schools
Films set in boarding schools
Films scored by Francis Lai
1970s German films